Livyntsi is a village in Dnistrovskyi Raion, Chernivtsi Oblast, Ukraine. It is the administrative centre of Livyntsi rural hromada, one of the hromadas of Ukraine.

Until 18 July 2020, Livyntsi was located in Kelmentsi Raion. The raion was abolished in July 2020 as part of the administrative reform of Ukraine, which reduced the number of raions of Chernivtsi Oblast to three. The area of Kelmentsi Raion was merged into Dnistrovskyi Raion.

Demographics
According to the 1989 census, the population of Livyntsi was 1,455 people, of whom 629 were men and 826 women.

Native language as of the Ukrainian Census of 2001:
 Ukrainian 98.76%
 Russian 0.76%
 Moldovan (Romanian) 0.41%
 Belarusian 0.07%

References

Villages in Dnistrovskyi Raion